Rite² is an ambient music album by Julian Cope, released in 1997. It is technically Cope's fourteenth solo album, but is also the follow-up to the earlier album Rite (released in 1992 and credited to "Julian Cope & Donald Ross Skinner")  and is the second in the Rite series.

For Rite², Cope collaborated extensively with synthesizer player Thighpaulsandra (Coil, Spiritualized) although the album was credited to Cope alone. The album has been described as a tribute of sorts to Krautrock bands such as Amon Düül II and Tangerine Dream and is based on the sound of the Mellotron and the wah-wah guitar, although it also employs miscellaneous tone generators the ARP 2600 synthesizer and the Hammond B3 organ, as well as vocal chants.

Rite² was the debut release on Cope's Head Heritage label, which would be the home of almost all of his future recordings.

Critical reception 
John Bush of Allmusic called  Rite² "one of Julian Cope's most consistent works" and commented: "Instead of leaping to and fro between undeniably catchy synth-pop and fractured end-of-the-century prog, Cope sticks to the prog and comes out better for it."

Track listing

Personnel
Credits adapted from the album's liner notes.

Musicians
Julian Cope – vocals, acoustic and electric guitar, Mellotron 400 and Mark 2
Thighpaulsandra – grand piano, ARP 2600, Mellotron 400, Faerial 5
Mark "Rooster" Cosby – crystal machine, tone generator, accordion
Donald Ross Skinner – Hammond B3 organ, crystal machine and alto stylophone
Jody Evans – kraut/stereo presence and un-rec. percussions 
Technical
Julian Cope – producer, directed by
Thighpaulsandra – recorded by, computed by
Shaun Harvey – recorded by
Adam Fullerton – Mr. Sandra's modifications 
Martin Smith – all Mellotronic maintenance
John Bradley – all Mellotronic maintenance
Get Carter/Copix – design

References

External links
 Rite² on Discogs.com. Retrieved on 23 April 2018.

1997 albums
Julian Cope albums